This article contains information about the literary events and publications of 1991.

Events
February – Sisters Vanessa Redgrave (Olga) and Lynn Redgrave (Masha) make their first and only joint appearance on stage, with niece Jemma Redgrave as Irina, in the title rôles of Chekhov's Three Sisters at the Queen's Theatre, London.
July 11 – Hitoshi Igarashi (born 1947), Japanese translator of Salman Rushdie's 1988 novel The Satanic Verses, is stabbed to death at the University of Tsukuba during The Satanic Verses controversy, in accordance with a fatwa against those involved in circulating the book.
October – Irvine Welsh's first published fiction, the short story "The First Day of the Edinburgh Festival", appears in New Writing Scotland. It is later incorporated into Trainspotting.
November 4 – An archaeological expedition is launched, eventually resulting in the discovery of a mass grave and identification of the body of the novelist Alain-Fournier, 77 years after his death as Lieutenant Henri-Alban Fournier in World War I. His bones are interred at Saint-Remy-la-Calonne.

New books

Fiction
Julia Alvarez – How the García Girls Lost Their Accents
Martin Amis – Time's Arrow: or the Nature of the Offence
Piers Anthony
Tatham Mound
Question Quest
Virtual Mode
Jeffrey Archer – As the Crow Flies
Beryl Bainbridge – The Birthday Boys
Clive Barker – Imajica
Pat Barker – Regeneration
Julian Barnes – Talking It Over
Louis Begley – Wartime Lies
Louis de Bernières – Señor Vivo and the Coca Lord
Xurxo Borrazás – Cabeza de chorlito
A. S. Byatt – Possession: A Romance
Agatha Christie (d. 1976) – Problem at Pollensa Bay and Other Stories
Tom Clancy – The Sum of All Fears
Mary Higgins Clark – Loves Music, Loves to Dance
Hugh Cook – The Werewolf and the Wormlord
Paul Cornell – Timewyrm: Revelation
Bernard Cornwell – Stormchild
Douglas Coupland – Generation X: Tales for an Accelerated Culture
L. Sprague de Camp and Catherine Crook de Camp – The Pixilated Peeress
Don DeLillo – Mao II (1992 PEN/Faulkner Award for Fiction)
Terrance Dicks – Timewyrm: Exodus
Assia Djebar – Far from Medina (Loin de Médine)
Stephen R. Donaldson
The Gap into Conflict: The Real Story
The Gap into Vision: Forbidden Knowledge
Roddy Doyle – The Van
Kaori Ekuni (江國 香織) – Kirakira Hikaru (Twinkle, Twinkle)
Bret Easton Ellis – American Psycho
Joy Fielding – See Jane Run
Stephen Fry – The Liar
Diana Gabaldon – Outlander
Neil Gaiman 
The Sandman: Preludes & Nocturnes (graphic novel; volume 1 in The Sandman series)
The Sandman: Dream Country (graphic novel; volume 3 in The Sandman series)
John Gardner – The Man from Barbarossa
David Gates – Jernigan
Ann Granger – Say It With Poison
John Grisham – The Firm
Josephine Hart – Damage
Elisabeth Harvor – Our Lady of All Distances (11 stories; revision of Women and Children, 1973)
Mark Jacobson – Gojiro (The Lampshade: A Holocaust Detective Story from Buchenwald to New Orleans)
Stephen King – Needful Things
John le Carré – The Secret Pilgrim
Leslie Marmon Silko – Almanac of the Dead
Penelope Lively – City of the Mind
Morgan Llywelyn – Druids
James A. Michener – Mexico
Rohinton Mistry – Such a Long Journey
Timothy Mo – The Redundancy of Courage
Cees Nooteboom – The Following Story
Ben Okri – The Famished Road (1991 Booker Prize)
Leonardo Padura Fuentes – Pasado perfecto (translated as Havana Blue)
John Peel – Timewyrm: Genesys
Tito Perdue – Lee
Ellis Peters – The Summer of the Danes
Marge Piercy – He, She and It
Terry Pratchett
Reaper Man
Witches Abroad
Jean Raspail – Sire
Alexandra Ripley – Scarlett
J. Jill Robinson – Saltwater Trees
Nigel Robinson – Timewyrm: Apocalypse
Bernice Rubens – A Solitary Grief
Norman Rush – Mating (1991 National Book Award for Fiction)
José Saramago – The Gospel According to Jesus Christ (O Evangelho Segundo Jesus Cristo)
Michael Shaara (posthumously) – For Love of the Game
Sidney Sheldon – The Doomsday Conspiracy
Jane Smiley – A Thousand Acres (1991 National Book Critics Circle Award for Fiction; 1992 Pulitzer Prize for Fiction)
Danielle Steel – Heartbeat
James B. Stewart – Den of Thieves
Michael Swanwick – Gravity's Angels
Antonio Tabucchi – Requiem: A Hallucination
Amy Tan – The Kitchen God's Wife
Andrew Vachss – Sacrifice
Bernard Werber – Empire of the Ants (Les Fourmis)
Tim Winton – Cloudstreet
Helen Zahavi – Dirty Weekend
Timothy Zahn – Heir to the Empire
Haifa Zangana – Through the Vast Halls of Memory
Roger Zelazny – Prince of Chaos

Children and young people
Arnold Adoff – In for Winter, Out for Spring
Chris Van Allsburg – The Wretched Stone
Avi – Nothing but the Truth: A Documentary Novel
Margaret Barbalet (illustrated by Jane Tanner) – The Wolf
Berlie Doherty – Dear Nobody
Sarah Ellis – Pick-Up Sticks
Karen Wynn Fonstad (with J. R. R. Tolkien and Alan Lee) - The Atlas of Middle-earth
Jostein Gaarder – Sophie's World (Sofies verden), English translation 1995
Sonia Levitin – The Man Who Kept His Heart in a Bucket
Jacqueline Wilson – The Story of Tracy Beaker (first in the Tracy Beaker series of six books)
G. Clifton Wisler – Red Cap

Drama
Ariel Dorfman – Death and the Maiden
Tony Kushner – Angels in America: A Gay Fantasia on National Themes (first part premières)
Mustapha Matura – The Coup
Philip Ridley – The Pitchfork Disney
Neil Simon – Lost in Yonkers
George Tabori – Goldberg Variations
Timberlake Wertenbaker – Three Birds Alighting on a Field

Poetry

Non-fiction
Dionne Brand – No Burden to Carry: Narratives of Black Working Women in Ontario
Marjorie Chibnall – Empress Matilda
Henry Steele Commager – Churchill's History of the English-Speaking Peoples
Jung Chang (張戎) – Wild Swans: Three Daughters of China
Françoise Dunand – Mummies: A Voyage Through Eternity
Koenraad Elst – Ayodhya and after: issues before Hindu society
Dave Foreman – Confessions of an Eco-Warrior
Robert Hart – Forest Gardening: Rediscovering Nature and Community in a Post-Industrial Age
Albert Hourani – A History of the Arab Peoples
Anne Hugon – The Exploration of Africa: From Cairo to the Cape
Alan Macfarlane – The Diary of Ralph Josselin, 1616–1683
Madonna – Sex
Robert K. Massie – Dreadnought: Britain, Germany, and the Coming of the Great War
Taslima Nasrin – Jabo na keno? jabo 
P.J. O'Rourke – Parliament of Whores
Thomas Pakenham – The Scramble for Africa
William Pokhlyobkin – A History of Vodka
John Richardson – A Life of Picasso
Simon Schama – Dead Certainties
Art Spiegelman – Maus: A Survivor's Tale (II: And Here My Troubles Began) (graphic biography/autobiography)
Georges Tate – L'Orient des Croisades
Marie Wadden – Nitassinan: The Innu Struggle to Reclaim Their Homeland
Naomi Wolf – The Beauty Myth: How Images of Beauty Are Used Against Women
Zhang Chengzhi – History of the Soul

Births
January 23 – Jonahmae Panen Pacala (known as Jonaxx), Filipino Wattpad author
April 1 – Kat Zhang, American young-adult and middle grade fiction writer
April 20 – Marieke Lucas Rijneveld, Dutch novelist and poet
unknown dates
Gabriel Bergmoser, Australian author, playwright, and screenwriter
Sally Rooney, Irish fiction writer

Deaths
January 22 – Robert Choquette, Canadian novelist and poet (born 1905)
January 23 – Northrop Frye, Canadian literary critic (born 1912)
January 29 – Yasushi Inoue, Japanese novelist (born 1907)
February 1 – Ahmad Abd al-Ghafur Attar, Saudi Arabian writer, journalist and poet (born 1916)
February 16 – Muhammad Sa'id al-Amudi, Saudi Arabian journalist, literary critic and official (born 1905) 
February 24 – John Daly, American journalist and game show host (born 1914)
March 14 – Margery Sharp, English novelist and children's writer (born 1905)
March 22 – Paul Engle, American poet and novelist (born 1908)
April 3 – Graham Greene, English novelist (born 1904)
April 4 – Max Frisch, Swiss playwright and novelist (born 1911)
April 12 – James Schuyler, American poet (born 1923)
April 15 – Dante Milano, Brazilian modernist poet (born 1899)
May 3 – Jerzy Kosinski, Polish-American novelist (born 1933; suicide)
May 31 – Angus Wilson, English novelist (born 1913)
June 24 – Sumner Locke Elliott, Australian-American author and playwright (born 1917)
July 5 – Howard Nemerov, American poet (born 1920)
July 24 – Isaac Bashevis Singer, Polish-born Jewish-American novelist (born 1902)
August 1 – Yusuf Idris, Egyptian writer (born 1927)
August 17 – Terence Kilmartin, Irish journalist and translator (born 1922)
September 4 
Peggy Ramsay, British theatrical agent (born 1908)
Tom Tryon, American actor and writer (born 1926)
September 24 – Dr. Seuss (Theodor Seuss Geisel), American children's writer (born 1904)
September 27 – Roy Fuller, English poet (born 1912)
October 7 – Natalia Ginzburg, Italian writer (born 1916)
October 11 – Steven "Jesse" Bernstein, American performance poet (born 1950; suicide)
October 12 – Arkady Strugatsky, Russian science fiction writer (born 1925)
October 16 – Leon Levițchi, Romanian translator (born 1918)
October 27 – George Barker, English poet (born 1913)
November 29 – Frank Yerby, African American historical novelist (born 1916)
December 11 – Artur Lundkvist, Swedish author (born 1906)
December 27 – Hervé Guibert, French writer and photographer (born 1955)
Unknown date – Gogu Rădulescu, Romanian communist politician, journalist, and patron of the arts (born 1914)

Awards
Nobel Prize for Literature: Nadine Gordimer
Camões Prize: José Craveirinha

Australia
The Australian/Vogel Literary Award: Andrew McGahan, Praise
C. J. Dennis Prize for Poetry: Jennifer Maiden, The Winter Baby
Kenneth Slessor Prize for Poetry: Jennifer Maiden, The Winter Baby
Mary Gilmore Prize: Jean Kent, Verandahs
Miles Franklin Award: David Malouf, The Great World

Canada
See 1991 Governor General's Awards for a complete list of winners and finalists for those awards.
The Edna Staebler Award is established to honor the best literary work of creative non-fiction by a Canadian author who had published their first or second writing within the preceding year. 
Edna Staebler Award for Creative Non-Fiction: Susan Mayse, Ginger 
Arthur Ellis Award for Best True Crime: Susan Mayse, Ginger

France
Prix Goncourt: Pierre Combescot, Les Filles du Calvaire
Prix Décembre: Raphaël Confiant, Eau de café
Prix Médicis: Pierre Simon, La Dérive des sentiments

United Kingdom
Booker Prize: Ben Okri, The Famished Road
Carnegie Medal for children's literature: Berlie Doherty, Dear Nobody
Cholmondeley Award: James Berry, Sujata Bhatt, Michael Hulse, Derek Mahon
Eric Gregory Award: Roddy Lumsden, Glyn Maxwell, Stephen Smith, Wayne Burrows, Jackie Kay
Guardian Fiction Award: Alan Judd, The Devil's Own Work
James Tait Black Memorial Prize for fiction: Iain Sinclair, Downriver
James Tait Black Memorial Prize for biography: Adrian Desmond and James Moore, Darwin
Queen's Gold Medal for Poetry: Judith Wright
Whitbread Best Book Award: John Richardson, A Life of Picasso
The Sunday Express Book of the Year: Michael Frayn, A Landing on the Sun

United States
Agnes Lynch Starrett Poetry Prize: Julia Kasdorf, Sleeping Preacher
Aiken Taylor Award for Modern American Poetry: John Frederick Nims
American Academy of Arts and Letters Gold Medal in Poetry: Richard Wilbur
Bernard F. Connors Prize for Poetry: Donald Hall, The Museum of Clear Ideas
Compton Crook Award: Michael Flynn, In the Country of the Blind
Frost Medal: Donald Hall
Nebula Award: Michael Swanwick, Stations of the Tide
Newbery Medal for children's literature: Jerry Spinelli, Maniac Magee
Pulitzer Prize for Drama: Neil Simon, Lost in Yonkers
Pulitzer Prize for Fiction: John Updike: Rabbit at Rest
Pulitzer Prize for General Non-Fiction: Edward O. Wilson: The Ants
Pulitzer Prize for Poetry: Mona Van Duyn: Near Changes
Whiting Awards:
Fiction: Rebecca Goldstein, Allegra Goodman, John Holman, Cynthia Kadohata, Rick Rofihe, J Anton Shammas (fiction/nonfiction)
Nonfiction: Stanley Crouch
Plays: Scott McPherson
Poetry: Thylias Moss, Franz Wright

Elsewhere
Premio Nadal: Alfredo Conde Cid, Los otros días

References

 
Years of the 20th century in literature